Matiu Waitai Rata (26 March 1934 – 25 July 1997) was a Māori politician who was a member of the New Zealand Parliament for the Labour Party from 1963 to 1980, and a cabinet minister from 1972 to 1975. In 1979 he resigned from the Labour Party and formed the Mana Motuhake Party.

As the first-ever Māori Minister of Lands, and the first Māori Minister of Māori Affairs, writes Tiopira McDowell, in the space of three years from 1972, "Rata reformed Māori land policies, elevated the status of the Treaty of Waitangi and Waitangi Day, increased government spending on housing and education and initiated a small but significant shift towards the protection and recognition of Māori language and culture. The Waitangi Tribunal he was instrumental in establishing would be his most lasting and significant contribution to the nation's political history."

Early life
Rata was born at Te Hāpua to Te Āta (Arthur) Waitai Rata and Mereana Harowe. His tribal connections were with Ngāti Kurī, Te Aupōuri and Ngāti Whātua. He moved to Te Wharau, near Dargaville, with his family in 1942. His father died in a logging accident when he was 10, in December 1944; his mother Mereana moved to Freemans Bay in Auckland with her four children to find work as a cleaner. The entire family lived in one room in a rambling house, home to eleven other families, all of whom shared the outhouse.

Rata joined the Labour Party in his teens, in 1951 during the waterfront dispute.

"'When you lived in Nelson Street,' he said, 'where 11 families lived in one house, well, there has got to be something better than that.'" wrote Paula Morris, quoting Rata. "[His] childhood experiences formed his sense of social injustice, and therefore his politics."

By late 1947, a polio epidemic was closing Auckland schools. It is believed that this outbreak ended Rata’s formal schooling.

Work and personal life 
Rata became a merchant seaman in 1950, at the age of sixteen. Four years later he left marine service, and married Nellie Ererua, possibly around 1957, the year his mother died. During these years he worked as a farm labourer, truck driver and spray painter. In 1960 he started work as a spray painter at the Ōtāhuhu Railway Workshops, where he became a union organiser, rising to join the Ōtāhuhu executive of the Amalgamated Society of Railway Servants. He became chairperson of his local Labour Party branch, and Auckland Labour area organiser for Tapihana Paikea, the Northern Māori member of parliament. Paikea died in January 1963, and Rata won the resulting by-election, becoming a Member of Parliament in March 1963 at the age of 28.

Rata was a committed member of the Rātana Church. He had three children – two sons and a daughter.

Political career

He was the Minister of Lands and Minister of Māori Affairs in the Third Labour Government of New Zealand between 1972 and 1975. He was the architect of both the Māori Affairs Amendment Act of 1974, which gave Māori greater control over their land, and the 1975 creation of the Waitangi Tribunal.

In 1979 he resigned from the Labour Party. In 1980 he resigned from Parliament and formed the Mana Motuhake Party to contest the resulting . He was defeated by Bruce Gregory, coming second with 991 fewer votes than Gregory.

Following his exit from Parliament Matiu Rata was the leader of the Muriwhenua in presenting their Treaty of Waitangi claims to the Waitangi Tribunal, resulting in a settlement of Māori fishing claims for the tribes of the Far North.

He contested Northern Maori at every election from 1981 to 1990 for Mana Motuhake and in 1993 for the Alliance. In 1994 he retired from the Mana Motuhake leadership in favour of Alliance MP Sandra Lee.

Rata died on 25 July 1997 from injuries received eight days earlier when his car was hit head on by a vehicle driven by a foreign tourist who reportedly fell asleep at the wheel.

Rata's widow, Nellie Rata, stood for ACT in Te Tai Tokerau at the 1999 general election, having been unsuccessful in securing the Alliance nomination. She received 280 votes, to finish in seventh place in the 13-candidate race.

References

External links

 Maori Leaders

|-

1934 births
1997 deaths
New Zealand Labour Party MPs
Leaders of political parties in New Zealand
Members of the Cabinet of New Zealand
New Zealand MPs for Māori electorates
Mana Motuhake politicians
Members of the New Zealand House of Representatives
Ngāti Kurī people
Ngāti Whātua people
Unsuccessful candidates in the 1990 New Zealand general election
Unsuccessful candidates in the 1987 New Zealand general election
Unsuccessful candidates in the 1984 New Zealand general election
Unsuccessful candidates in the 1981 New Zealand general election